José Antonio Paradela (born 15 December 1998) is an Argentine professional footballer who plays as a midfielder for River Plate.

Career
Rivadavia were Paradela's first senior club after he started out at Club Atlético Quiroga, with the midfielder making his first two career appearances in the 2016 Torneo Federal B campaign; which Rivadavia ended with promotion to Torneo Federal A. After being picked thirty-six times in the subsequent 2016–17 and 2017–18 seasons, Paradela departed the club on 8 August 2018 after agreeing to join Argentine Primera División side Gimnasia y Esgrima. He made his first appearance on 2 December versus River Plate, appearing for the final twenty-three minutes as he made his Primera División bow under Pedro Troglio.

After twenty-seven appearances for Gimnasia y Esgrima, Paradela completed a transfer to River Plate on 18 February 2021.

Career statistics
.

Notes

References

External links

1998 births
Living people
Sportspeople from Buenos Aires Province
Argentine footballers
Association football midfielders
Torneo Federal A players
Argentine Primera División players
Rivadavia de Lincoln footballers
Club de Gimnasia y Esgrima La Plata footballers
Club Atlético River Plate footballers